Stealth inflation is a type of charges or fees created by businesses to gain extra profit and revenue from its customers.  The stealth part of the term is that business will often use miscellaneous fees to charge customers without the customers even knowing the fees existed as they were hidden in the fine print of a signed a contract. The inflation part of the term relates to the up charging of the service without actually providing anything additional. Since most companies charge a fee to accept payment, a portion gets built into profit and revenue.  A big example of stealth inflation can be overdraft fees from banks surcharges from Telco providers, processing fees and installation fees. Another form of stealth inflation is devaluation of money by a government, sometimes in order to pay off debt with lower value currency. The unintended higher cost of imported goods and raw material is passed on to the consumer yet not part of traditional definition of inflation.

Examples

Electric and Television Providers 
Stealth inflation can also be calculated in service payment fees.

For example, an electric bill can average from $119.99 or more. When consumers go to pay the bill the processing fee can add an additional 5 - 6% to the subtotal.

Department Stores 

Some department stores have what is called the last 90-day policy: "A customer returning an item is subject to refund based on the lowest sale price within the last 90 days." with or without a receipt depending on the store.

 $39.99  Amount customer paid for a pair of pants
 $19.99  Lowest price point of returned product in the last 90 days, hence
 $19.99  Amount refunded
 $20.00  Customer takes the loss
    50%  Profit Gain for the company (assuming no depreciation in value of the returned product)

Phone Service 
A customer signs up for a cellular service which the phone company states that it's only $49.99 at sign up. However, when the first bill arrives there are surcharges, roaming charges and connection fees on top of the base price. (This is usually made known to customers during sign up in order to avoid complaints.)

Bank Overdrafts 

Another good example is the bank overdraft fee. As you can see below, if a normal checking account costs $15.00 per month then the bank just made 10 times that in a single day.

Further reading 
 Liz Pulliman Weston MSN money and personal finance
 NY times article on Stealth Inflation

References 

Inflation